Ismail Riahi (1907-?) was an Iranian military officer, who also served as minister of agriculture. Part of one of the most famous Chaleshtar families, his elder brother, Colonel Dr. Mohammad Riahi, was the president of the University of Isfahan, who devoted all his personal land to the expansion of the university. His other brother was Ibrahim, the Minister of Health in the second Pahlavi era. Ismail went through the military step by step and in 1960 he became a lieutenant general in the army and then deputy chief of staff of the army.

Ministerial period 

During his ministerial period, the land reform that had begun before him continued. During his time as Minister, the White Revolution took place, one of the foundations of which was land reform.

With his departure from the Ministry of Agriculture, the ministry was transformed into the Ministry of Agriculture, Agricultural Production and Natural Resources (apparently in the second cabinet), and a series of changes were made to the minister's authority.

After the ministerial period 
From 1971 to 1978, he was the head of the Southern Fisheries Department.

References 

1908 births
Year of death missing
20th-century Iranian politicians
Agriculture ministers of Iran
Imperial Iranian Army lieutenant generals
People of Pahlavi Iran
Politicians from Tehran